360 Waves is the debut album by American Hip hop trio Durag Dynasty (rappers Planet Asia, Killer Ben and TriState). The group worked on the album with hip-hop producer The Alchemist, who produced it entirely. The album was released on March 26, 2013, by Nature Sounds.

Background
Durag Dynasty collaborated with The Alchemist on his album, Russian Roulette, on the song "Junkyard Fight Scene". Before the release of that album however, Alchemist released a track with them "Spuddnik Webb", that was supposed to be on Russian Roulette but eventually was not featured on the album. The album has been in the works since January 2012.

On February 27, 2013, the album was released for pre order, and the official track list was premiered. The album contains 15 songs, all produced by The Alchemist, with guest appearances by Evidence, Prodigy, Phil The Agony, Big Twins, The Alchemist himself, Chace Infinite and Iman Thug.

Critical reception
360 Waves received generally favorable reviews. HipHopDX gave it 3.5/5. XXL Magazine gave it a 3/5.

Track listing
 All tracks produced by The Alchemist

References

2013 debut albums
Albums produced by the Alchemist (musician)
Planet Asia albums
Nature Sounds albums